Gosasi is a very small village in the Khed (Rajgurunagar) Taluka with a population of less than 1,500.

Economy
SEZ has acquired some of the village area for development. 
The Bajaj foundation works with people to improve the villagers' standard of living.

Awards
Gosasi wins many awards in "Sant Gadgebaba Swchata abhiyan", launched by the Maharashtra Government.
In this village, people work hard to improve the image of the award-winning village.

Villages in Ratnagiri district